Marine Fighting Squadron 471 (VMF-471) was a short-lived fighter squadron of the United States Marine Corps during World War II.  The squadron served as a Fleet Replacement Squadron tasked with training new naval aviators to fly the Vought F4U Corsair.  The squadron did not participate in combat action during the war and was decommissioned after approximately 16 months of service on September 10, 1945. No other Marine Corps squadron has carried VMF-471's lineage and honors since that time.

History
Marine Fighting Squadron 471 (VMF-471) was commissioned on May 15, 1944 at Marine Corps Air Station El Centro, California by authority of CominChf confidential dispatch serial 081915 AvPlngDir 24-KV-44. The squadron originally fell under the command of Marine Aircraft Base Defense Group 43. On July 23, 1944 a detachment from the squadron was sent to a new base, Marine Corps Outlying Field Camp Pendleton, California. For the flight there, 23 of the squadron's F4U Corsairs formed the numbers 4 - 7 - 1 in the sky and flew from MCAS El Centro to Pasadena, CA in order to get to get filmed by Newsreel cameras and then continued on to MCOLF Camp Pendleton. 

On October 10, 1944, personnel and equipment from VMF-471, minus aircraft, were transferred to Marine Aircraft Base Defense Group 46 at Marine Corps Air Station El Toro, CA. The squadron fell in on the aircraft that belonged to VMF-482, a squadron that had recently been decommissioned. On October 16, the squadron was officially designated as a training squadron. In December, the detachment at Pendleton which at its peak had 31 F4U Corsairs and 3 SBD divebombers rejoined the squadron at MCAS El Toro. On September 10, 1945, authorized by Marine Fleet Air, West Coast (MFAWC) dispatch 072333 dated September 8, 1945 and Commanding General, MWAFC dispatch 08184 dated September 8, 1945 the squadron was decommissioned.

Accidents
August 31, 1944 - 2ndLt James W. Randell was killed in a crash involving 3 x F4U Corsairs in the vicinity of El Centro, CA.
October 26, 1944 - 1stLt Richard C. Englund's F4U Corsair was declared lost at sea when he failed to return from a training mission.

Notable former members
John F. Bolt - the only U.S. Marine to achieve ace status in two wars and also the only Marine jet fighter ace served as an instructor with the squadron.

Commanding Officers
The following naval aviators served as commanding officers of VMF-472 during its existence: 
1stLt Harold G. Sandbach - May 15-21, 1944
Capt Warren J. Turner - May 22, 1944-June 8, 1944
Maj Robert B. Fraser - June 9, 1944-November 30, 1944
Maj Horace A. Pehl - December 1, 1944-May 20, 1945
Maj Arthur T. Werner - May 21, 1945-June 15, 1945
Maj John R. Spooner - June 16, 1945-July 5, 1945
Maj Robert J. Holm - July 6-23, 1945
Maj Hugh I. Russell - July 24, 1945-September 10, 1945

Unit awards

A unit citation or commendation is an award bestowed upon an organization for the action cited. Members of the unit who participated in said actions are allowed to wear on their uniforms the awarded unit citation. VMF-471 was presented with the following awards:

See also
 United States Marine Corps Aviation
 List of active United States Marine Corps aircraft squadrons
 List of decommissioned United States Marine Corps aircraft squadrons

Citations

References
Bibliography

 

Fighting471
Inactive units of the United States Marine Corps
Military units and formations established in 1944
Military units and formations disestablished in 1945